The 1921 Los Angeles Angels season was the 19th season for the Los Angeles Angels playing in the Pacific Coast League (PCL).  The team won the PCL pennant with a 108–80 record. Red Killefer was the manager and also appeared in 103 games, principally as a center fielder.

Right fielder Sam Crawford, at age 41, appeared in 175 games and led the team with a .318 batting average and a .463 slugging percentage. He was later inducted into the Baseball Hall of Fame. 

Center fielder Jigger Statz, at age 23, compiled a .310 batting average, went on to play 18 seasons for the Angels until retiring after the 1942 season, and was later inducted into the Pacific Coast League Hall of Fame. 

First baseman Art Griggs, at age 37, hit .294 and led the team with 69 extra-base hits and 302 total bases.

The team's pitching staff was led by Doc Crandall with 24 wins, Vic Aldridge with a 2.16 earned run average (ERA), and Art Reinhart with a .750 winning percentage (15-5 win–loss record).

1921 PCL standings

Statistics

Batting 
Note: Pos = Position; G = Games played; AB = At bats; H = Hits; Avg. = Batting average; HR = Home runs; SLG = Slugging percentage

Pitching 
Note: G = Games pitched; IP = Innings pitched; W = Wins; L = Losses; PCT = Win percentage; ERA = Earned run average

References

Further reading
 "The Greatest Minor League: A History of the Pacific Coast League, 1903-1957", by Dennis Snelling (McFarland 2011)
 "The Los Angeles Angels of the Pacific Coast League: A History, 1903-1957", by Richard Beverage (McFarland 2011)

1921 in sports in California
Pacific Coast League seasons